Rose Stone (born Rosemary Stewart, March 21, 1945) is an American singer and keyboardist. She is best known as one of the lead singers in Sly and the Family Stone, a popular psychedelic soul/funk band founded by her brothers, Sly Stone and Freddie Stone. She often wore a platinum-colored wig while performing with the band, and was noted for her strong vocals. She was inducted into the Rock and Roll Hall of Fame in 1993 as a member of Sly and the Family Stone.

After the band's dissolution in 1975, "Sister Rose" (as she was also known) married Sly Stone's former manager/co-producer, Bubba Banks.  She later recorded a solo album on Motown Records, billed  as Rose Banks.

During the 1980s and 1990s, Stone worked as a backing session singer, appearing on recordings by Michael Jackson, Phish, Ringo Starr, Reef and Bobbysocks!. Stone is today part of the musical department at her brother Freddie's church. She returned to her gospel roots in 1983 when she sang on Sandra Crouch's Grammy Award-winning album We Sing Praises, soloing on the old hymn "Power in the Blood". She has been associated with the Crouch family and the music department of Christ Memorial COGIC in California for many years. She also sang backing vocals on the gospel-influenced tracks "You R Loved" and "Get Away" from Victoria Williams' 1994 album Loose. Also in 1994, she sang backing vocals on two songs on psychedelic rock band Phish's fifth album Hoist.

She also appears on Robbie Williams' album Escapology on the track "Revolution", a duet with Williams. She is the featured soloist in the church choir in the movie The Ladykillers. She is heard also in the music in the final credits. Her daughter, Lisa Stone, sang with Vet Stone and Cynthia Robinson in a Sly & the Family Stone tribute band. In 2006, Stone reunited with the original Family Stone.

In 2011 and 2012, Stone and her daughter Lisa toured with Elton John as members of his vocal backing group.

Stone appears briefly in a deleted scene "Judith's Youth" on the DVD of the movie 20 Feet from Stardom.

Discography
Albums
 Rose (1976)
 Already Motivated (2008)

References 

1945 births
Living people
African-American women singers
American funk singers
American gospel singers
Motown artists
Sly and the Family Stone members
American soul singers
Musicians from Vallejo, California
Singers from California
20th-century American singers
21st-century American singers
Members of the Church of God in Christ
African-American Christians
American soul keyboardists
American rhythm and blues keyboardists
American funk keyboardists
Rhythm and blues pianists
20th-century American women singers
21st-century American women singers
Elton John Band members
20th-century women pianists
21st-century women pianists